Gaetano Di Pierro (born December 1, 1948 in Orta Nova) is an Italian clergyman and prelate for the Roman Catholic Diocese of Farafangana. He was appointed bishop in 2018.

See also
Catholic Church in Madagascar

References

External links

1948 births
Living people
21st-century Italian Roman Catholic bishops
People from the Province of Foggia